The Finn was a sailing event on the Sailing at the 1960 Summer Olympics program in Naples. Seven races were scheduled. 35 sailors, on 35 boats, from 35 nations competed.

Results 

DNF = Did Not Finish, DNS= Did Not Start, DSQ = Disqualified 
 = Male,  = Female

Daily standings

Conditions at Naples 
Of the total of three race areas were needed during the Olympics in Naples. Each of the classes was using the same scoring system. The Northern course was used for the Finn.

Notes

References 
 
 
 

 

Finn
Finn competitions